The Rysum organ in Rysum Church in Rysum, north Germany, is the oldest instrument of its kind in northern Europe that still largely has its original pipes. It is also one of the oldest playable church organs in the world alongside those in Sion, St. Valentin in Kiedrich, and Ostönnen. It was originally built in 1457 and rebuilt in 1513. After undergoing several other modifications through the years it was restored to its 1513 condition by Jürgen Ahrend and Gerhard Brunzema in 1959. The organ has seven stops on one manual.

Stop List 

 Meantone tuning
 Slider chest*
 Wedge bellows*

Annotations

Literature 

 Walter Kaufmann: Die Orgeln Ostfrieslands. Ostfriesische Landschaft, Aurich 1968.
 Ralph Nickles: Orgelinventar der Krummhörn und der Stadt Emden. Hauschild, Bremen 1995, .
 Harald Vogel, Günter Lade, Nicola Borger-Geweloh: Orgeln in Niedersachsen. Hauschild, Bremen 1997, .
 Harald Vogel, Reinhard Ruge, Robert Noah, Martin Stromann: Orgellandschaft Ostfriesland. 2. print. Soltau-Kurier-Norden, Norden 1997, .

References

Rysum, Rysum organ
Church in East Frisia